The men's lightweight event was part of the boxing programme at the 1984 Summer Olympics. The weight class allowed boxers of up to 60 kilograms to compete. The competition was held from 29 July to 11 August 1984. 40 boxers from 40 nations competed.

Medalists

Results
The following boxers took part in the event:

First round
 Christopher Ossai (NGR) def. Zan Latt (BUR), 5:0
 Angel Beltre (DOM) def. Dal Ranamagar (NEP), 5:0
 Leopoldo Cantancio (PHI) def. Solomon Kondowa (MLW), 5:0
 Asif Dar (PAK) def. Shlomo Niazov (ISR), 5:0
 Chun Chil-Sung (KOR) def. Patrick Waweru (KEN), 3:2
 Slobodan Pavlović (YUG) def. Luciano Solis (MEX), 3:2
 Renato Cornett (AUS) def. Viorel Ioana (ROU), 4:1
 Hernán Guttierez (COL) def. Mustafa Fadli (MAR), 5:0

Second round
 José Antonio Hernando (ESP) def. Jean-Claude Labonte (SEY), 5:0
 Douglas Odane (GHA) def. Dieudonne Kossi (RCA), RSC-3
 Luis Ortiz (PUR) def. Buala Sakul (THA), KO-2
 Alex Dickson (GBR) def. Desire Ollo (GAB), 5:0
 Gordon Carew (GUY) def. André Kimbu (ZAI), 5:0
 Martin N'Dongo (CMR) def. Shadrah Odhiambo (SWE), RSC-2
 Fahri Sumer (TUR) def. Bakary Fofana (IVC), 5:0
 Jaineck Chinyanta (ZAM) def. Errol Phillip (GRN), RSC-2
 Geoffrey Nyeko (UGA) def. Ama Sodogah (TOG), 5:0
 Pernell Whitaker (USA) def. Adolfo Mendez (NIC), 5:0
 Reiner Gies (FRG) def. Samir Khenyab (IRQ), 4:1
 John Kalbhenn (CAN) def. Wilson Randrinasolo (MDG), RSC-1
 Christopher Ossai (NGR) def. Angel Beltre (DOM), RSC-2
 Leopoldo Cantancio (PHI) def. Asif Dar (PAK), 5:0
 Chun Chil-Sung (KOR) def. Slobodan Pavlović (YUG), 4:1
 Renato Cornett (AUS) def. Hernán Guttierez (COL), 5:0

Third round
 José Antonio Hernando (ESP) def. Douglas Odane (GHA), 5:0
 Luis Ortiz (PUR) def. Alex Dickson (GBR), KO-2
 Martin N'Dongo (CMR) def. Gordon Carew (GUY), KO-2
 Fahri Sumer (TUR) def. Jaineck Chinyanta (ZAM), 5:0
 Pernell Whitaker (USA) def. Geoffrey Nyeko (UGA), 5:0
 Reiner Gies (FRG) def. John Kalbhenn (CAN), 5:0
 Leopoldo Cantancio (PHI) def. Christopher Ossai (NGR), 5:0
 Chun Chil-Sung (KOR) def. Renato Cornett (AUS), 4:1

Quarterfinals
 Luis Ortiz (PUR) def. José Antonio Hernando (ESP), 5:0
 Martin N'Dongo (CMR) def. Fahri Sumer (TUR), 4:1
 Pernell Whitaker (USA) def. Reiner Gies (FRG), 5:0
 Chun Chil-Sung (KOR) def. Leopoldo Cantancio (PHI), RSC-3

Semifinals
 Luis Ortiz (PUR) def. Martin N'Dongo (CMR), 3:2
 Pernell Whitaker (USA) def. Chun Chil-Sung (KOR), 5:0

Final
 Pernell Whitaker (USA) def. Luis Ortiz (PUR), AB-2

References

Lightweight